Bishop Barron may refer to:
Robert Barron (bishop) (born 1959), auxiliary bishop of Los Angeles
Patrick Barron (bishop) (1911–1991), Bishop of George